Eureka is a small western suburb of the Byron Shire, in New South Wales, Australia. , the population was 343.

References

Populated places in New South Wales